George McMaster (1862 – 14 September 1944) was a New Zealand cricketer. He played in one first-class match for Wellington in 1891/92.

See also
 List of Wellington representative cricketers

References

External links
 

1862 births
1944 deaths
New Zealand cricketers
Wellington cricketers